Dawu or DAWU may refer to:

Dominica
Dominica Amalgamated Workers' Union

Ghana
Dawu (Ghana), a town in the Eastern Region
Dawu Sports Stadium, located in Accra, Ghana

Mainland China
Dawu County, Hubei (大悟县), of Xiaogan, Hubei
Dawu County, Sichuan, or Daofu County (道孚县) from its pinyin name, of Garzê Tibetan Autonomous Prefecture, Sichuan

Towns 
Dawu, Xuzhou (大吴镇), in Jiawang District, Xuzhou, Jiangsu
Dawu, Tengzhou (大坞镇), in Tengzhou City, Shandong

Written as "大武镇":
Dawu, Fangshan County, in Fangshan County, Shanxi
Dawu Town, Maqên County, in Maqên County, Qinghai

Townships 
Dawu Township, Zhecheng County (大仵乡), in Zhecheng County, Henan

Written as "大武乡":
Dawu Township, Shangshui County, in Shangshui County, Henan
Dawu Township, Maqên County, town in Maqên County, Qinghai

 Dawu, Dongkou (大屋瑶族乡), a Yao ethnic township of Dongkou County, Hunan

Taiwan
Dawu, Taitung (大武鄉), township in Taitung County